Jubril is the name of:

Jubril Aminu, Nigerian cardiologist
Jubril Martins-Kuye, Nigerian politician
Jubril Okedina, English footballer

See also
Jibril (disambiguation)